Gliszczyński (feminine: Gliszczyńska; plural: Gliszczyńscy) is a Polish surname. Notable people with this surname include:

 Irmina Gliszczyńska (born 1992), Polish sailor
 Krzysztof Gliszczyński (born 1962), Polish painter

Polish-language surnames